In Greek mythology, Thalia or Thaleia ( or ;  Tháleia, "the joyous, the abundance", from  / thállein, "to flourish, to be green") was a nymph daughter of Hephaestus. She was also given as an anthropomorphic secondary deity of plant life and shoots, possibly as the culmination of the transmission of knowledge on volcanic ash's use as a fertiliser, characteristic of ancient viticulture in volcanic soils such as those of the island of Santorini.

Mythology 
Macrobius's Saturnales (song V) states how Zeus seized Thalia while he was in the form of an eagle, as he did with Aegina, Leto and Ganymede. He then made love to her near the river Symethe on Sicily. She buried herself in the ground to avoid Hera's jealousy. Her twin children, the Palici, were thus born under the earth, though other authors make the Palici the sons of Hephaestus or Adranus.

See also 
Thalia (Muse)
Thalia (Nereid)
Thalia (Grace)

Notes

References 
 Smith, William; Dictionary of Greek and Roman Biography and Mythology, London (1873). "Thaleia" 3.

External links 
 THALIA from The Theoi Project

Nymphs
Children of Hephaestus
Divine women of Zeus